Gary Busey: Pet Judge is an American streaming nontraditional comedy court miniseries starring Gary Busey. Written by Justin Wright Neufeld and Galloway Allbright, the show features Busey adjudicating pet-related disputes within a courtroom setting.

Alongside Busey, the show stars comedian Mike E. Winfield as a bailiff and Ian Abramson as a post-trial interviewer, and was narrated by Shadoe Stevens. The show premiered on May 25, 2020, and consists of six episodes.

See also
 Judge Steve Harvey (2022–present) originally a miniseries court show that because of its reception has earned more seasons, hosted by comedian Steve Harvey
 Judy Justice (2021–present) another streaming court show, which is arbitrated by popular Judge Judy Sheindlin (famed for Judge Judy)
 Eye for an Eye (2003 TV program) – a court show produced by National Lampoon, Inc.

References

External links
 

2020 American television series debuts
2020 American television series endings
2020s American legal television series
Dramatized court shows
English-language television shows
Amazon Prime Video original programming